Brigitte Nganaye (born 28 October 1973) is a Central African Republic middle-distance runner. She competed in the women's 800 metres at the 1992 Summer Olympics.

References

1973 births
Living people
Athletes (track and field) at the 1992 Summer Olympics
Central African Republic female middle-distance runners
Olympic athletes of the Central African Republic
Place of birth missing (living people)